The women's team foil was one of eight fencing events on the fencing at the 1980 Summer Olympics programme. It was the sixth appearance of the event. The competition was held from 26 to 27 July 1980. 43 fencers from 9 nations competed.

Rosters

Results

Round 1

Round 1 Pool A 

Cuba and France each defeated East Germany, 8–8 (68–67 on touches) and 11–5, respectively. The two victors then faced off. France won 9–5.

Round 1 Pool B 

Italy and the Soviet Union each defeated Romania, 9–7 and 11–5, respectively. The two victors then faced off. The Soviet Union won 9–4.

Round 1 Pool C 

Great Britain defeated Hungary, 8–8 with a touches tie-breaker of 61–58. Hungary then beat Poland, 10–6. Great Britain needed only a win or narrow loss to advance (8–8 would be sufficient to ensure Great Britain's advancement through the bouts tie-breaker, while a 9–7 loss would require looking to the touches tie-breaker), but Poland won decisively at 12–4 to set a three-way tie at 1–1. The bouts tie-breaker left Great Britain out of the elimination rounds. Poland had a 122–106 touches record to Hungary's 119–113, giving the Polish team the first place in the group.

Elimination rounds

References

Foil team
1980 in women's fencing
Fen